In botany, "Cladodes" may refer to a synonym of the genus Alchornea or to the plural of "cladode".

Cladodes is a genus of  firefly beetles.

It used to be included in the subfamily Amydetinae, which is probably a highly artificial paraphyletic assemblage however. Thus, the genus is moved to the Lampyrinae for the time being.

Species within this genus include:
 Cladodes flabellatus Solier in Gay, 1849
 Cladodes malleri Pic, 1935

References

Lampyridae
Lampyridae genera
Bioluminescent insects

Cladode A green leaf-like plant shoot.